Petrești is a commune in Dâmbovița County, Muntenia, Romania with a population of 5,969 people. It is composed of seven villages: Coada Izvorului, Gherghești, Greci, Ionești, Petrești, Potlogeni-Deal and Puntea de Greci.

The wife of communist Romanian dictator Nicolae Ceaușescu, Elena Ceaușescu, was born there on 7 January 1916.

References

Communes in Dâmbovița County
Localities in Muntenia